Mantas Panovas (born 20 August 1989) is a Lithuanian former goalball player who competed at international goalball competitions. He is a Paralympic champion, World champion and triple European champion. He was a former long jumper and sprinter before switching to goalball in 2007, he played for Lithuania's men's national goalball team from 2009 to 2020, he retired early following injury problems.

References

1989 births
Living people
Sportspeople from Rokiškis
Paralympic goalball players of Lithuania
Goalball players at the 2012 Summer Paralympics
Goalball players at the 2016 Summer Paralympics
Medalists at the 2016 Summer Paralympics
Paralympic gold medalists for Lithuania
Paralympic medalists in goalball